Unequal Protection: The Rise of Corporate Dominance and the Theft of Human Rights is a 2004 book by Thom Hartmann.  The book explains that the largest and most powerful transnational corporations dominate the lives of most of the world's citizens. According to the book, their CEOs are "unapproachable and live lives of nearly unimaginable wealth and luxury"; they value growth and profit no matter what the cost, and this has become disruptive for life on Earth.

References

2004 non-fiction books
Political books
Books about multinational companies
Books about human rights